Charles R. Hoffman is a Democratic former member of the Kentucky House of Representatives, representing the 62nd district from 1997 to 2011.

Hoffman served as majority caucus chairman from 2007 to 2008, and led the Democratic majority to its height of 66 Democrats and 34 Republicans in the House. He is the only individual from Scott County, Kentucky to ever serve in a leadership post.

In November 2010, he was defeated for re-election by Ryan Quarles (R-Scott), 49% to 51%.

External links
Kentucky Legislature - Representative Charlie Hoffman official government site
Project Vote Smart - Representative Charles R. 'Charlie' Hoffman (KY) profile
Follow the Money - Charlie Hoffman
2008 2006 2004 2002 2000 1998 1996 campaign contributions
KentuckyVotes.org - Rep. Charlie Hoffman bills introduced and voting record

Democratic Party members of the Kentucky House of Representatives
1956 births
Living people
People from Georgetown, Kentucky